Cavenderichthys talbragarensis is a species of prehistoric bony fish found in the Talbragar Fish beds.  Recently, it has been placed as a member of Orthogonikleithridae, alongside Leptolepides, Orthogonikleithrus and Waldmanichthys.

References

External links
 

Prehistoric fish of Australia
Prehistoric bony fish genera
Jurassic bony fish